Authors' Reading Month is the largest Central European literary festival running annually since 2000. The organiser is the Větrné mlýny Publishers, (Brno, CZ) and the festival takes place every July 1–31. Every day 2–3 readings take place performed by writers of the host country and writers from the festival guest country.

At present (as of 2016), the festival takes place in 5 cities simultaneously, spanning 4 countries: Brno and Ostrava (CZ), Wroclaw (PL), Košice (SK), and Lviv (UA). In 2020 the festival guest country was Hungary.

History 

In the years 2000–2004 the main festival venue was the Kabinet múz (formerly HaDivadlo). Since 2005 the venue has been the Husa na provázku (Goose on a String) Theatre in Brno, CZ. Since 2016 the festival runs parallel in 5 cities in 4 countries. The readings are also available online at the Publishers YouTube channel, and broadcast by radios.

In the years 2000–2004 the festival was dedicated only to Czech writers, featuring one performing author per day. Since 2005 the festival has hosted a guest country every year, offering 2–3 readings every day, one by the homeland author and another by a foreign writer from the guest country. The guest countries of the past years are these:
 2005 Slovakia
 2006 Berlin (Germany)
 2007 Belarus
 2008 Canada
 2009 Austria and Stuttgart
 2010 France (since this year the festival has run a parallel venue in Ostrava)
 2011 Poland (since this year the festival has run parallel venues in Wroclaw and Košice)
 2012 Slovenia
 2013 German-language authors
 2014 Scotland (10 TV documentaries of Scottish writers were made by the Czech TV.
 2015 Ukraine (since this year the festival has run a parallel venue in Lviv; TV documentaries with Ukrainian writers were made by the Czech TV)
 2016 Spain
 2017 Georgia
 2018 Turkey
 2019 Romania
 2020 Hungary
 2021 Iceland

References

https://web.archive.org/web/20171009194310/http://www.effe.eu/festival/authors-reading-month

External links 
 

Literary festivals in the Czech Republic
Literary festivals in Poland
Literary festivals in Europe
Culture in Lviv
2000 establishments in the Czech Republic
Czech literature
Ukrainian literature
Summer events in the Czech Republic